Wailua is an unincorporated community in Maui County on the island of Maui in the state of Hawaii.

Wailua shares the ZIP code of 96713 with Keanae and Hana.

References 

Unincorporated communities in Maui County, Hawaii
Populated places on Maui
Unincorporated communities in Hawaii